The United States District Court for the Western District of New York (in case citations, W.D.N.Y.)  is the federal district court whose jurisdiction comprises the western parts of Upstate New York.

Appeals are taken to the Second Circuit (except for patent claims and claims against the U.S. government under the Tucker Act, which are appealed to the Federal Circuit).

Jurisdiction 
The Western District of New York includes the following counties: Allegany, Cattaraugus, Chautauqua, Chemung, Erie, Genesee, Livingston, Monroe, Niagara, Ontario, Orleans, Schuyler, Seneca, Steuben, Wayne, Wyoming, and Yates. Cities within its jurisdiction include Buffalo, Rochester, and Elmira.  From 1904 to 1916, the court met at the United States Post Office (Lockport, New York).

The United States Government is represented in the district by the United States Attorney for the Western District of New York.  the U.S. Attorney is Trini E. Ross.

Current judges 
:

Vacancies and pending nominations

Former judges

Chief judges

Succession of seats

See also 
 Courts of New York
 List of current United States district judges
 List of United States federal courthouses in New York

References

External links 
 United States District Court for the Western District of New York Official Website
 United States Attorney for the Western District of New York Official Website

New York, Western District
New York (state) law
Buffalo, New York
Rochester, New York
Elmira, New York
1900 establishments in New York (state)
Courts and tribunals established in 1900